Beryl Nesbitt is an actress and model with numerous roles in major films, TV dramas and theatre productions spanning from the mid-1950s to the present day.

She gained public recognition for her role as the housekeeper Annie Hughes in the 1983 TV series The Citadel and as Simone in the 1986 series Bluebell. She worked alongside Richard Beckinsale as part of the cast on the comedy series Bloomers, which was incomplete before he died. Of later years she has had a starring role in the Notting Hill Anxiety Festival and appeared as Mikey's nan in Doghouse as well as being the prominent face on Amstel Lager posters. She played a screaming prisoner in the episode The Way Back of Blake's 7.

External links
 
 https://web.archive.org/web/20120327202903/http://artist.ebay.co.uk/Beryl-Nesbitt_movies_W0QQcZ1397409592
 http://www.aveleyman.com/ActorCredit.aspx?ActorID=63191
 https://web.archive.org/web/20120727065308/http://ltdb.co.uk/node/5933

English film actresses
English television actresses
Living people
Year of birth missing (living people)